Costiniu is a Romanian surname. Notable people with the surname include:

  (born 1954), Romanian lawyer and judge
 Geo Costiniu (1950−2013), Romanian film actor

Romanian-language surnames